Wondra may refer to

A brand of Gold Medal Flour
Jubilee (comics), a Marvel Comics character also known as "Wondra"
Ellen Wondra, American theologian